The Canadian Securities Administrators (“CSA’) have made the harmonization of the registration rules among the jurisdictions of Canada a key goal. Pursuant to this goal new national securities regulations have been drafted - NI 31-103  to provide uniform requirements and categories of registration for dealers in exempt market securities across the country.

Exempt Market Dealer Requirements

NI 31-103 introduces consistent rules for Exempt Market Dealers concerning proficiency, conduct, capital and compliance requirements and makes it clear that EMDs are subject to the same know-your-client (“KYC”) and suitability requirements as other dealer categories.
Exempt market dealers, and the registered individuals who work for them, may act as a dealer or underwriter for any securities which are prospectus exempt, as a dealer for any securities sold to clients who qualify for purchase of exempt securities, and as a dealer for investment funds which are either prospectus qualified or prospectus exempt.

Exempt market dealers are different than:
-Full service investment dealers which engage in trading for all types of clients including retail clients and are required to be members of the self-regulatory organization, the Investment Industry Regulatory Organization of Canada (IIROC);
-Mutual fund dealers which are restricted to trading in mutual funds and are required to be members of the self-regulatory organization, the Mutual Funds Dealers Association (MFDA);
scholarship plan dealers which are restricted to trading in scholarship plans and educational trusts; and
-Restricted dealers.

Exempt market dealers must follow the same "Know Your Client" procedures as other registered dealers which ensures that each client's personal, financial and investment profile is understood and confirmed prior to any trading activity. Exempt market dealers must also ensure that any exempt security is suitable for a particular client by considering the particular investment product as well as each individual client's investment goals and profile. EMD advisors need to make sure their letters of engagement and investment policy statements clearly outline mutual expectations and the manner in which the advisor is being paid.

There are key regulatory documents for EMDS. The applicable provincial and territorial securities legislation, regulations and rules for any person or firm will generally depend on the jurisdiction of residence of the investor and dealer or adviser and the jurisdiction in which the registerable activity occurs. The websites of the securities regulatory authority in each province and territory can be accessed through links in our "Staying Informed" section.

Proposed Amendments to National Instrument 31-103, June 25, 2010 
National Instrument 31-103 Registration Requirements and Exemptions Companion Policy to NI 31-103
Staff Notice 31-312 Exempt Market Dealers - Transition Staff Notice 31-311
Northwest Registration Exemption for Intermediaries "Alternative Approach to Regulating Exempt Market Intermediaries in Certain Jurisdictions"
Alberta Securities Commission Blanket Order 31-505
CSA Staff Notice 31-313 - NI 31-103 Registration Requirements and Exemptions and Related Instruments Frequently Asked Questions as of December 18, 2009
CSA Staff Notice 31-314 - NI 31-103 Registration Requirements and Exemptions and Related Instruments Frequently Asked Questions as of February 5, 2010

Western Exemption - Blanket Order
A number of registration exemptions are being maintained in certain jurisdictions – particularly in Alberta, British Columbia, Manitoba, the Northwest Territories, Nunavut and the Yukon Territory.  These jurisdictions have indicated that they will each pass a blanket order exempting individuals and firms from the EMD registration requirement created in NI 31-103.  Alberta has set their blanket order for 31-505.
Presently the Blanket Order would provide an exemption to a firm or person that trades in securities (subject to meeting all of the conditions of the Blanket Order) under one of the following capital-raising exemptions in National Instrument 45-106 – Prospectus and Registration Exemptions:
 accredited investor;
 family, friends and business associates;
 offering memorandum; or
 CAD$150,000 minimum purchase.

References

See also
Accredited investor
Canada Revenue Agency
Canadian Securities Administrators

Investment